Akio Sato may refer to:

, Japanese Communist Party politician
, Japanese Liberal Democratic Party politician
Akio Satō (politician, born 1952)
, Japanese professional wrestler